Gittenbergeria turriplana of air-breathing land snail, terrestrial pulmonate gastropod mollusks in the family Trissexodontidae.

Distribution 

This species is endemic to Algarve, southern Portugal. It is frequent species in Algarve and locally very common.

Description 
The shell is brown with a characteristic microsculpture, depressed with a strong keel. The first whorls are almost flat. The aperture is narrow. Margin reflected and turned outward. There are two teeth on the lower edge corresponding to 2 conspicuous depressions on the outer shell. The umbilicus is open and eccentric.

The width of the shell is 12–14 mm. The height of the shell is 5–6 mm.

Animal is almost black with a lighter foot, upper tentacles very long.

Ecology 
It lives in low altitudes on calcareous substrate, close to the coast. It is frequent at old walls and in old gardens and parks in cities, also in shrublands and cultivated areas.

References
This article incorporates public domain text from the reference

External links
 photo of Gittenbergeria turriplana

Trissexodontidae
Gastropods described in 1845
Taxonomy articles created by Polbot